Richard Weston was MP for Petersfield from  1593 to 1597.

References

People from Petersfield
English MPs 1593